Self-portrait with Sir Endymion Porter is a self-portrait by Anthony van Dyck, showing him with his patron Sir Endymion Porter.

Painting
The painting was produced in 1635 and measures 119 cm by 127 cm. It is now in the Museo del Prado in Madrid, Spain.

It is van Dyck's only self-portrait to include another figure, showing Porter's importance in his life. The pair had first met in 1620, during van Dyck's first stay in London. Porter was Charles I of England's main art dealer, negotiating to acquire the vast art collection of the Duke of Mantua and also collecting art for himself. He also knew Peter Paul Rubens and Orazio Gentileschi. Van Dyck presented the double portrait to Porter himself - it was later acquired by Isabella Farnese, who owned it by 1745, and passed from her collection to the Prado.

References 
Sources
 Gian Pietro Bellori, Vite de' pittori, scultori e architecti moderni, Turín, Einaudi, 1976. 
 Didier Bodart, Van Dyck, Prato, Giunti, 1997. 
 Christopher Brown, Van Dyck 1599-1641, Milán, RCS Libri, 1999.  
 Justus Müller Hofstede, Van Dyck, Milán, Rizzoli/Skira, 2004. 
 Stefano Zuffi, Il Barocco, Verona, Mondadori, 2004.

Notes

External links
 Museo del Prado: Collection catalogue entry for Sir Endymion Porter y Anton van Dyck 

Self-portraits by Anthony van Dyck
Portraits by Anthony van Dyck
1635 paintings
17th-century portraits
Portraits of men
Paintings of the Museo del Prado by Flemish artists